Washington Writers' Publishing House is a cooperative, member-run, non-profit small press publishing poetry and fiction.  The press was founded by Grace Cavalieri and John McNally in 1973 to publish authors who live in the Washington-Baltimore region.  According to their guidelines, they publish only manuscripts submitted to their contests for which a significant fee is charged.

In addition, the press has released two anthologies, The Poet Upstairs, edited by Octave Stevenson (1979), and Hungry As We Are, edited by Ann Darr (1995).

The press has received financial support through grants from the DC Commission on the Arts and Humanities, the Lannan Foundation, the National Endowment for the Arts, The Nation magazine, and the Poetry Society of America.

Critical reviews
The poet Henry Taylor has stated that the Washington Writers' Publishing House had "built an audience of national significance. It is among the most successful recent literary experiments in the country."

References

External links 
Washington Writers Publishing House Website

Book publishing companies of the United States
Publishing companies established in 1973
Poetry publishers
Non-profit publishers
Small press publishing companies